Grakhovsky District (Grah joros) is an administrative and municipal district (raion), one of the twenty-five in the Udmurt Republic, Russia. It is located in the southwest of the republic. Its administrative center is the rural locality (a selo) of Grakhovo. Population:  10,879 (2002 Census);  The population of Grakhovo accounts for 34.7% of the district's total population.

Geographic information
The district is bordered by Kiznersky District of Udmurtia in the West, Mozhginsky District of Udmurtia in the North, Alnashsky District in the East and the Republic of Tatarstan in the South. An eastern part of the district is located in the Mozhga Hills and a western part of the district is located in the Umyak River's valley. On territory of the district there are rivers: Umyak, Bolshoy Syryan, Yaga, Adamka, Kuzebayka, Yurashka (tributary of the Toyma), Yurashka (tributary of the Adamka), Sayka, Vozzhayka, Kokshanka, Tylovayka and Eryksa.

The area of the district is 967.74 square kilometers. The woodiness of the district is 35.1 %.

Population

References

Sources

Districts of Udmurtia